The Association of Classical Christian Schools (ACCS) is an organization founded in 1994 to encourage the formation of Christian schools using a model of classical education.  The association's website lists over 300 member schools with more than 40,000 students.

The classical Christian education movement was launched by the publication in 1991 of a book entitled Recovering the Lost Tools of Learning by Doug Wilson. Wilson was also the founder of one of the first classical Christian schools in Moscow, Idaho, Logos School.

Wilson himself had drawn inspiration from an earlier article published by Dorothy Sayers entitled "The Lost Tools of Learning" (1948). Sayers was a colleague of C.S. Lewis and J. R. R. Tolkien. In this article she derided modern education methods and called for a return to the ancient classical trivium.

The classical Christian education movement has also been influenced by Norms and Nobility by David V. Hicks as well as the CiRCE Institute, founded by Andrew Kern, which exists to promote classical Christian education.  In 2016, Kevin Clark and Ravi Jain authored The Liberal Arts Tradition, published by Classical Academic Press which was later revised in 2019, with a foreword by Dr. Peter Kreeft.  This work was widely endorsed as an essential explanation of the philosophy of classical Christian education by over 14 leaders within the movement, including Dr. John Frame, Andrew Kern, Dr. Phillip J. Donnelly (Baylor Honors College), and David Goodwin, President of the ACCS.

The ACCS conducts Repairing the Ruins, an annual conference in June that draws between 1000 and 1300 classical educators annually.  The conference took its name from an essay "Of Education" by John Milton.  The public information service of the ACCS is The Classical Difference.  This service operates online and in print.  The Classical Difference magazine has a circulation of more than 16,000 parents and educators quarterly.

References

External links
Official website

Christian educational organizations
Christian schools in the United States
Classical Christian schools
Organizations established in 1994
Private and independent school organizations
United States schools associations